Fahrner is a surname. Notable people with the surname include:

Kate Fahrner, American actress and singer
Theodor Fahrner (1859–1919), German jewellery designer
Thomas Fahrner (born 1963), German  swimmer
Nachman Fahrner (born 1972), Jewish rock musician
Ulrich Fahrner, Swiss sports shooter

See also 
Fahrner Image Replacement